Cellier is a French surname meaning "storeroom". Notable people with the surname include:

Alexandre Cellier (born 1966), Swiss musician, Marcel Cellier's son
Alexandre Eugène Cellier (1883–1968), French organist and composer
Alfred Cellier (1844–1891), English composer, orchestrator and conductor
Antoinette Cellier (1913–1981), English actress
Caroline Cellier (1945–2020), French actress
Elizabeth Cellier (fl. 1668–1688), English midwife
Germaine Cellier (1909–1976), French perfumer
François Cellier (1849–1914), English conductor and composer
Frank Cellier (actor) (1884–1948), English actor
Jérôme Cellier (born 1984), French footballer
Marcel Cellier (1925–2013), Swiss organist and musicologist
Peter Cellier (born 1928), English actor

See also
Cellier-du-Luc, commune in  Ardèche, France
Le Cellier, commune in Loire-Atlantique, France

French-language surnames